Joel Alexander Cliffe (born 2 April 1980) is an English former first-class cricketer.

Cliffe was born at Oxford in April 1980. He was educated at St Birinus School, before going up to Gonville and Caius College, Cambridge. While studying at Cambridge, Cliffe played first-class cricket in 2001, making three appearances for Cambridge UCCE against Kent, Essex and Sussex. He took 2 wickets from the 53 overs in total that he bowled across his three matches.

References

External links

1980 births
Living people
Cricketers from Oxford
Alumni of Gonville and Caius College, Cambridge
English cricketers
Cambridge MCCU cricketers